WCLT-FM (100.3 MHz) is a commercial radio station broadcasting a country music radio format. It is owned by WCLT Radio and uses the slogan Today's Country and Your All-Time Favorites, T-100. Licensed to Newark, Ohio, it serves the Columbus metropolitan area.  In morning drive time, T-100 carries the syndicated Big D and Bubba Show.

WCLT-FM has an effective radiated power (ERP) of 50,000 watts, the current maximum for most of Ohio.  The transmitter and studios are on Jacksonville Road (Ohio State Route 13) in Newark.  WCLT-FM broadcasts using HD Radio technology.  The HD2 digital subchannel carries a mainstream rock format known as "104.7 The Big Lick."  It feeds FM translator W284CH at 104.7 MHz.

History
It was owned by The Advocate, Newark's daily newspaper. In its early days, WCLT-FM largely simulcast co-owned WCLT 1480 AM.  

By the 1970s, the FM station was offering separate programming.  While WCLT (AM) was a Top 40 station, WCLT-FM played automated easy listening music.  In the 1980s, the station made the transition to soft adult contemporary music.  In the 1990s, it flipped to country music.

References

External links

CLT-FM
Radio stations established in 1947
1947 establishments in Ohio